The Kenya Land and Freedom Army (KLFA), also known as the Mau Mau, was a guerrilla army, formed mainly by the people of central and eastern Kenya, dominated by the Kikuyu people. It resisted British colonialism in Kenya from the late 1940s to the early 1960s, culminating in the Mau Mau rebellion from 1952 to 1960. The army was led by Field Marshal Dedan Kimathi.

Structure 
An army platoon consisted of 500 up to 2,000 soldiers. In the latter case a General was assisted by a Colonel and a Brigadier. Generals included Chui, Kassam Njogu, China, Stanley Mathenge, and Bamuingi. The capture of rebel leader Dedan Kimathi, on 21 October 1956, fatally crippled the army, and ultimately ended the war. However, the army objective was achieved when Kenya attained self-government. General Bamuingi (People’s General) led a team that was killed on the battlefield by the Kenyatta government. After independence in 1965 they had returned to the forest to fight after independence. They claimed that independence fundamentally benefited the ‘barren’ of the land (collaborators and moderates). Their bodies were paraded in Meru Township for three days as the last chiefs of the Mau-Mau freedom terrorists".

Information systems 

One of the most important achievements of the KFLA was that they were able to development a robust and effective information system that combined oral experiences of ordinary Kenyans with print. Songs were produced to pass on important information and to raise political consciousness and at the same time newspapers would be published. The KFLA published over 50 newspapers in different languages such as Kiswahili, Gikuyu and other Kenyan languages. The KFLA also produced a large amount of sound recordings and had their own presses.

References 

1940s in Kenya
1950s in Kenya
1960s in Kenya
African resistance to colonialism
Guerrilla organizations
Rebel groups in Kenya
Resistance to the British Empire